Premlata Singh (born 15 January 1950) became a member of the 13th Haryana Legislative Assembly in 2014 from the BJP representing the Uchana Kalan Vidhan sabha Constituency in Haryana.

Premlata married Birender Singh on 9 June 1970. Birender Singh served as the Union Minister of Steel and Minister for Rural Development  in the Narendra Modi led NDA Government from July 2016 to April 2019.

Her son Brijendra Singh was previously a bureaucrat who served as an IAS officer of 1998 Batch and was posted in Haryana for 21 years. He was elected as Member of Parliament from Hisar in 2019 Indian general election.

See also
 Dynastic politics of Haryana

References 

People from Jind
Bharatiya Janata Party politicians from Haryana
Living people
Haryana MLAs 2014–2019
1950 births